Huzhou Station may refer to:

 Huzhou railway station, a railway station of the China Railway.
 Huzhou metro station , a new metro station of the Taipei Metro.